Loughgilly (or Loch Goilí) is a small village, townland and civil parish in County Armagh, Northern Ireland. It is on the main Armagh to Newry road, about halfway between the two. It is within the Armagh City and District Council area. It had a population of 84 people (42 households) in the 2011 Census. (2001 census: 69 people)

History 
The Loughgilly Together residents group was formed in October 1942 by people worried about deterioration of facilities and the appearance of the area. Today it runs a park and children's play area.

See also
List of civil parishes of County Armagh

References 

NI Housing Executive report 2003
1641 Rebellion

Villages in County Armagh
Civil parishes of County Armagh